Sergey Cherepanov (born January 25, 1986 in Ridder) is a Kazakhstani cross-country skier who has competed since 2001. His best World Cup finish was third in a 15 km event in Finland in 2008.

At the 2006 Winter Olympics in Turin, Cherepanov finished 55th in the sprint event. His best finish at the FIS Nordic World Ski Championships was tenth in the 4 x 10 km relay at Liberec in 2009.

He finished 11th in the 4 x 10 km relay at the 2010 Winter Olympics in Vancouver.

Career highlights
FIS Nordic Under 23 World Ski Championships Medals
2009 –  Praz de Lys Sommand  1st, 15 km freestyle

Universiade
2007 –  Pragelato  3rd, 10 km freestyle

Asian Winter Games
2007 –  Changchun  1st, 4×10 km relay
2011 –  Almaty  1st, 4×10 km relay (with Chebotko / Poltoranin / Velichko)
2011 –  Almaty  2nd, 30 km classical

World Cup podiums
2008 –  Lahti  3rd, 15 km classical

References

External links
 
 

1986 births
Cross-country skiers at the 2006 Winter Olympics
Cross-country skiers at the 2010 Winter Olympics
Cross-country skiers at the 2014 Winter Olympics
Kazakhstani male cross-country skiers
Living people
Olympic cross-country skiers of Kazakhstan
Asian Games medalists in cross-country skiing
Cross-country skiers at the 2007 Asian Winter Games
Cross-country skiers at the 2011 Asian Winter Games
Cross-country skiers at the 2017 Asian Winter Games
Medalists at the 2007 Winter Universiade
Asian Games gold medalists for Kazakhstan
Asian Games silver medalists for Kazakhstan
Medalists at the 2007 Asian Winter Games
Medalists at the 2011 Asian Winter Games
Medalists at the 2017 Asian Winter Games
Universiade medalists in cross-country skiing
Universiade bronze medalists for Kazakhstan
Cross-country skiers at the 2007 Winter Universiade
People from Ridder, Kazakhstan
21st-century Kazakhstani people